The Indian wolf (Canis lupus pallipes) is a subspecies of gray wolf that ranges from Southwest Asia to the Indian Subcontinent. It is intermediate in size between the Himalayan wolf and the Arabian wolf, and lacks the former's luxuriant winter coat due to it living in warmer conditions. Within this subspecies, the "Indian plains wolf" is genetically basal to all other extant Canis lupus apart from the older-lineage Himalayan wolf, with both proposed as separate species. The Indian wolf travels in smaller packs and is less vocal than other variants of the gray wolf, and has a reputation for being cunning. The Indian wolf is one of the most endangered populations of gray wolf in the world.

Taxonomy
The Indian wolf was first described to Western science in 1831 by the British ornithologist William Henry Sykes under the binomial Canis pallipes. In 1941, Reginald Pocock subordinated it to Canis lupus under the trinomial Canis lupus pallipes.

Admixture with other Canis species
In 2018, whole genome sequencing was used to compare members of the genus Canis. The study found evidence of gene flow between African wolves, golden jackals, and gray wolves (from Saudi Arabia and Syria). One African wolf from the Egyptian Sinai Peninsula showed high admixture with the Middle Eastern gray wolves and dogs, highlighting the role of the land bridge between the African and Eurasian continents in canid evolution. The African wolf was found to be the descendant of a genetically admixed canid of 72% gray wolf and 28% Ethiopian wolf ancestry.

Canis indica

The Indian plains wolf (Canis lupus pallipes, synonym Canis indica) is formed by 2 closely related female lineage mitochondrial DNA (mDNA) haplotypes that fall within the Canis lupus pallipes subspecies of the gray wolf. It is only found in the arid and semi-arid peninsular plains of India. These lineages are genetically unique from all other wolves worldwide, including from other wolves forming C. l. pallipes. The Indian gray wolf and the Himalayan wolf are phylogenetically basal to all other wolves and are closer to the African wolf. This indicates that these are the descendants of an ancient wolf distribution. In April 2009, the Latin binomial Canis indica had been proposed for these 2 haplotypes as a nomenclatural and taxonomic split from Canis lupus as a new species through the Nomenclature Specialist on the CITES Animals Committee. The committee recommended against this proposal but recommended that the name be entered into the species database as a synonym of the name under which it was listed. The proposal was based on one study that relied on only a limited number of museum and zoo samples that may not have been representative of the wild population, and a call for further fieldwork was made.

Earlier, two studies had sequenced the mDNA of the Indian gray wolf and found that it is basal to all other extant Canis lupus haplotypes apart from the older-lineage Himalayan wolf. Later studies compared these sequences against worldwide wolf sequences and confirmed this basal position. One study, based on a fossil record, estimated that the divergence between the coyote and the wolf lineages occurred 1 million years ago and with an assumed wolf mutation rate, estimated that the divergence of the Indian gray wolf from the wolf/dog ancestor occurred 400,000 years ago. Another study, which expressed concerns about the earlier study, gave an estimate of 270,000 years ago.

The Indian gray wolf is endangered and its population is estimated at 2,000-3,000. It resembles C. l. pallipes in its outer appearance (morphological features) and its social/reproductive behavior, but it is smaller in size. It is genetically distinct from C. l. pallipes. These findings suggest that the Indian gray wolf is not the pallipes found in the Middle East and Central Asia. It was therefore proposed that the Indian gray wolf be reclassified as a separate species Canis indica. In 2016, a study of the mDNA of both modern and ancient wolves indicated that the Indian gray wolf and the Himalayan wolf were genetically basal when compared with all other gray wolves.

In 2021, a study compared both the mitochondrial DNA and the nuclear DNA (from the cell nucleus) from the wolves of the Himalayas with those of the wolves from the lowlands of the Indian subcontinent. The genomic analyses indicate that the Himalayan wolf and the Indian lowland wolf were genetically distinct from one another. These wolves were also genetically distinct from – and genetically basal to – the other wolf populations across the northern hemisphere. These other wolves form a single mitochondrial clade, indicating that they originated from a single expansion from one region within the last 100,000 years. However, the nuclear analysis indicated that the Indian lowland wolf and the Himalayan wolf had separated from this lineage around 200,000 years ago, with the Indian lowland wolf being genetically basal to the Himalayan wolf. This nuclear DNA finding conflicts with mitochondrial DNA findings of the Himalayan wolf being the most basal, however the Himalayan wolf has admixed with a more basal but unidentified canid and this is what was being reflected in its mDNA. Wolves from Syria and Iran clustered with the other wolves, although these and the Indian lowland wolves are taxonomically classified together as the single subspecies Canis lupus pallipes. The wolves of this subspecies share morphological characteristics due to their adaptation to arid environments.

The taxonomic reference Mammal Species of the World (2005) does not recognize Canis indica, however NCBI/Genbank does list Canis lupus indica.

Iranian wolf
A study demonstrated minor morphological variations of the skull of Iranian wolves but these did not vary enough to support them being a separate subspecies, however their genetic lineage has not been verified.

Description 

The Indian wolf is similar in structure to the Eurasian wolf, but is smaller, more slightly built, and has shorter fur with little to no underfur. Like the Arabian wolf, it has short, thin fur in summer, though the hair on the back remains long even in summer, an adaptation thought to be against solar radiation. The fur is generally grayish-red to reddish-white with gray tones. The hairs are grizzled with black, particularly on the back, which sports a dark V-shaped patch around the shoulders. The limbs are paler than the body, and the underparts are almost completely white. Pups are born sooty-brown, with a milk-white patch on the chest that fades with age. Black specimens are rare, but have been recorded in India's Solapur district and two regions of Iran. In the latter country, the mutation was found to be naturally occurring, unlike in North American gray wolves, which have inherited the Kb allele responsible for melanism from past interbreeding with dogs.

Behaviour and ecology 
Its habits are similar to those of other grey wolf subspecies, though the Indian wolf generally lives in smaller packs rarely exceeding 6-8 individuals, and is relatively less vocal, having rarely been known to howl. Indian wolf vocalization includes howls, howl-barks, whimper, social squeals, and whines with howls an average fundamental frequency of 422 Hz and whines 906 Hz. There is at least one record of a lone wolf associating with a pair of dholes in Debrigarh Wildlife Sanctuary. It tends to breed from mid-October to late December, and whelp in holes or ravines. It typically preys on antelopes, rodents, and hares. It usually hunts in pairs when targeting antelopes, with one wolf acting as a decoy while the other attacks from behind. The range of the Indian wolf overlaps with the golden jackal, sloth bear, leopard, Bengal fox, brown bear, Asiatic lion and Bengal tiger.

Hunting
Indian wolves are nocturnal and hunt from dusk to dawn, using different strategies for their various prey animals. These wolves are said to be exceptional in speed and endurance. An Indian wolf pack will spread themselves out when hunting Indian hares and various rodents, in contrast to coordinating when their target is the swift blackbuck antelope. The blackbuck is the major prey animal for wolves in Nannaj and Blackbuck National Park and constitute up to 88% of Indian wolf biomass consumption. Because the antelope is faster, Indian wolves will usually chase it toward ravines, bushes or hollows, where more wolves wait in ambush. In addition to leading antelopes into an ambush, Indian wolves can chase blackbucks down hills for a short-term burst in speed. Indian wolves may also select a sick or injured animal and separate it from the herd, pursuing it to exhaustion. This strategy is commonly seen in gray wolves, and often proves successful. Finally, when they close the distance and attack, a single wolf would grab the snout to asphyxiate the antelope while others attack the rear. Indian wolves are also reported to use curiosity to lure antelopes in for a kill. One story remarks that a wolf rolled over, legs upright, when the blackbucks were feeding. When the antelope accidentally disturbed this wolf, two others sprung up for the kill.

Distribution and status

West Asia
During the 19th century, wolves were widespread in many parts of the Holy Land east and west of the Jordan River. However, they decreased considerably in number between 1964 and 1980, largely due to persecution by farmers. Currently, Israel's conservation policies and effective law enforcement maintain a moderately sized wolf population, which radiates into neighbouring countries. Turkey may play an important role in maintaining wolves in the region, due to its contiguity with Central Asia. The mountains of Turkey have served as a refuge for the few wolves remaining in Syria. A small wolf population occurs in the Golan Heights, and is well protected by the military activities there. Although Turkish wolves have no legal protection, they may number about 7,000 individuals.

Little is known of current wolf populations in Iran, which once occurred throughout the country in low densities during the mid-1970s. Although widespread throughout the country, being absent only in the central desert and Dasht-e Lut, there is no reliable estimation on the wolf's population size there. Wolves in Iran continue to suffer from habitat loss, unregulated hunting and loss of prey.

Indian subcontinent

The northern regions of Afghanistan and Pakistan are important strongholds for the wolf. Hindus traditionally considered the hunting of wolves, even dangerous ones, as taboo, for fear of causing a bad harvest. The Santals, however, considered them fair game, as with every other forest-dwelling animal. During British India, wolves were not considered game species, and were killed primarily in response to them attacking game herds, livestock, and people. In 1876, in the North-West Provinces and Bihar State, 2,825 wolves were killed in response to 721 fatal attacks on humans. Two years later, 2,600 wolves were killed in response to attacks leaving 624 humans dead. By the 1920s, wolf extermination remained a priority in the NWP and Awadh. Overall, over 100,000 wolves were killed for bounties in British India between 1871 and 1916. In modern India, the Indian wolf is distributed across the states of Gujarat, Rajasthan, Haryana, Uttar Pradesh, Madhya Pradesh, Jharkhand, Maharashtra, Karnataka, Kerala and Andhra Pradesh. As of 2004, it is estimated that there are around 2000–3000 Indian wolves in the country. Mahuadanr Wolf Sanctuary in the state of Jharkhand is only wolf sanctuary in the country. They are mainly found outside of protected reserves and feed mainly on domestic animals, such as goats or sheep. However, in areas where natural prey is still abundant, for example in Velavadar National Park or Panna Tiger Reserve, natural prey species are still preferred. Although protected since 1972, Indian wolves are classed as Endangered, with many populations lingering in low numbers or living in areas increasingly used by humans. In March 2023, ten captive-bred wolves were released in Gujarat, a first for India. Although present in Bhutan, there is no information on the wolves occurring there.

Relationships with humans

Attacks on humans
Indian wolves have a history of preying on children, a phenomenon called "child-lifting". In 1878, 624 people were killed by wolves in Uttar Pradesh, and 14 others were killed in Bengal. In 1900, 285 people were killed in the Central Provinces. Between 1910 and 1915, 115 children were killed by wolves in Hazaribagh, and 122 were killed in the same area in 1980–1986. In Jaunpur, Pratapgarh and Sultanpur in Uttar Pradesh, wolves killed 21 children and mauled 16 others from March 27, 1996, to July 1, 1996. Between April 1993 and April 1995, five wolf packs attacked 80 children, 20 of whom were rescued, in Hazaribagh, West Koderma and Latehar Forest Divisions. The children were taken primarily in the summer period in the evening hours, and often within human settlements.

In Iran, wolf attacks have been reported for millennia. As with India, many cases of wolves making off with small children have been reported. Adults have been attacked on occasion, including an incident in which a policeman was killed and partially eaten by three wolves after dismounting from his horse to relieve himself. On January 2, 2005, in the village of Vali Asr, near the town of Torbat Heydariya, northeastern Iran, a wolf pack attacked a homeless man in front of witnesses. Although the police intervened, the man died of his wounds.

Predation on livestock
Indian wolves will feed on livestock when natural prey is scarce. This causes human-wolf conflicts and wolf persecution since human population density is high in these areas. Grass is quickly grazed by livestock in unprotected grasslands that cannot sustain a blackbuck population afterward. Among domestic animals, goats are the primary target for Indian wolves, comprising 66% of wolf attacks around the Jhelum district, with sheep following at 27%. Wolves are also more prone to preying on livestock during denning periods and with pups below 5–6 months old. It is not uncommon for locals to exaggerate the magnitude of Indian wolf depredation and tell tales of their predatory wiles, contributing to hatred of the animal.

In culture

Like the fox and the coyote, the Indian wolf has a reputation for being clever. There are many stories of their stratagems told by locals, observers and shepherds. The people of Maharashtra would sing labad landga dhong kartay, in Marathi which translates to "Wolves are clever animals and will fool you with their devilish methods."

Wolves are occasionally mentioned in Hindu mythology. In the Harivamsa, Krishna, to convince the people of Vraja to migrate to Vrindavan, creates hundreds of wolves from his hairs, which frighten the inhabitants of Vraja into making the journey. In the Rig Veda, Rijrsava is blinded by his father as punishment for having given 101 of his family's sheep to a she-wolf, who in turn prays to the Ashvins to restore his sight. Bhima, the voracious son of the god Vayu, is described as Vrikodara, meaning "wolf-stomached".

The wolf has an ambivalent reputation in Iranian culture, being demonised in the Avestas as a creation of Ahriman, and still features in contemporary cautionary tales told to misbehaving children.

Indian wolves take a central role in Rudyard Kipling's The Jungle Book series, in which a pack in the Seoni area of Madhya Pradesh adopts the feral child Mowgli, and teaches him how to survive in the jungle while protecting him from the Bengal tiger Shere Khan.

Notes

References

External links

 Wolf killed in the Bengali Sundarbans (in Bengali)

Mammals of India
Mammals of Pakistan
Mammals of Bangladesh
Mammals of South Asia
Wolf, Indian
Subspecies of Canis lupus
Wolves
Mammals described in 1831